Trochita is a genus of sea snails, marine gastropod mollusks in the family Calyptraeidae, the slipper snails or slipper limpets, cup-and-saucer snails, and Chinese hat snails.

Species
Species within the genus Trochita include:
 Trochita dhofarensis Taylor & Smythe, 1985
 Trochita pileolus (d'Orbigny, 1841)
 Trochita pileus (Lamarck, 1822)
 Trochita trochiformis (Born, 1778)
 Species brought into synonymy
 Trochita alta Hutton, 1885: synonym of Sigapatella terraenovae Peile, 1924
 Trochita calyptraeaformis : synonym of Trochita trochiformis (Born, 1778)
 Trochita clypeolum Reeve, 1859: synonym of Trochita pileus (Lamarck, 1822)
 Trochita corrugata Reeve, 1859: synonym of Trochita pileus (Lamarck, 1822)
 Trochita decipiens (Philippi, 1845): synonym of Trochita pileolus (d'Orbigny, 1841)
 Trochita georgiana A. W. B. Powell, 1951: synonym of Trochita pileolus (d'Orbigny, 1841)
 Trochita helicoidea (Sowerby, 1883): synonym of Calyptraea helicoidea (G.B. Sowerby II, 1883)
 Trochita radians (Lamarck, 1816): synonym of Trochita trochiformis (Born, 1778)
 Trochita spiralis Schumacher, 1817: synonym of Trochita trochiformis (Born, 1778)
 Trochita spirata (Forbes, 1852): synonym of Trochita trochiformis (Born, 1778)
 Trochita tenuis (Gray, 1867): synonym of Sigapatella tenuis (Gray, 1867)
 Trochita ventricosa Carpenter, 1857 : taxon inquirendum

References

 Taylor J.D. & Smythe K.R. (1985) A new species of Trochita (Gastropoda: Calyptraeidae) from Oman: A relict distribution and association with upwelling areas. Journal of Conchology 32: 39-48
 Gofas, S.; Afonso, J.P.; Brandào, M. (Ed.). (S.a.). Conchas e Moluscos de Angola = Coquillages et Mollusques d'Angola. [Shells and molluscs of Angola]. Universidade Agostinho / Elf Aquitaine Angola: Angola. 140 pp
 Rolán E., 2005. Malacological Fauna From The Cape Verde Archipelago. Part 1, Polyplacophora and Gastropoda

Calyptraeidae
Gastropod genera